Saigon 2 Bridge is a bridge crossing the Saigon River, connecting Bình Thạnh District and District 2, Ho Chi Minh City, Vietnam, on the Hanoi Highway. It is parallel to the Saigon Bridge, being 3 metres south of it and carrying traffic in the eastern direction. Congestion on the old Saigon Bridge required increased traffic capacity, with the new bridge doubling the number of lanes, carrying another 4 lanes plus a 2 lanes for motorbikes. Construction started in April 2012, and the bridge was opened for traffic in October 2013.

References

Transport in Ho Chi Minh City
Buildings and structures in Ho Chi Minh City
Road bridges in Vietnam
Bridges over the Saigon River
Bridges completed in 2013